Bay River College (formerly Evergreen College Calgary) is a Canadian private career college located in Calgary, Alberta. The college is a member of the Alberta Association of Career Colleges and the National Association of Career Colleges.  Founded in 2014 as Evergreen College Calgary, the institute was rebranded as Bay River College in 2018. The college specializes in one- and two-year programs in technology, healthcare, social work and business, with a focus on workplace placement and “real work” experience.

Programs

Bay River College offers programs in Technology, Healthcare, Social Work and Business. It offers one-year and two-year diplomas and certificates.

Clinical Research
Applied Clinical Research (1-year post-graduate diploma)

Technology
Applied Environmental Technology (2-year diploma)
Information Technology and Network Administrator (1-year diploma)
Cyber Security and Cloud Computing (2-year diploma)
Process Piping Drafting (1-year diploma)

Healthcare
Health Care Aide (1-year certificate)
Pharmacy Assistant (1-year diploma)
Unit Clerk & Medical Office Administration (1-year diploma)

Social Work
Community Support Worker (2-year diploma)
Education Assistant (1-year diploma)

Business
International Business Management (2-year diploma)
Hospitality Management (2-year diploma)

See also
Education in Alberta
List of colleges in Alberta
List of universities and colleges in Alberta

References

Universities and colleges in Calgary
Colleges in Alberta
Vocational education in Canada
2014 establishments in Alberta
Educational institutions established in 2014